This is a summary of the electoral history of Richard Seddon, Prime Minister of New Zealand, (1893–1906).

Parliamentary elections

1876 election

1879 election

1881 election

1884 election

1887 election

1890 election

1893 election

1896 election

1899 election

1902 election

1905 election

Notes

References

Bibliography

Seddon, Richard